Azriel Lévy (Hebrew: עזריאל לוי; born c. 1934) is an Israeli mathematician, logician, and a professor emeritus at the Hebrew University of Jerusalem.

Biography
Lévy obtained his Ph.D. at the Hebrew University of Jerusalem in 1958, under the supervision of Abraham Fraenkel and Abraham Robinson.  Later, using Cohen's method of forcing, he proved several results on the consistency of various statements contradicting the axiom of choice. For example, with J. D. Halpern he proved that the Boolean prime ideal theorem does not imply the axiom of choice. He discovered the models L[x] used in inner model theory.  He also introduced the notions of Lévy hierarchy of the formulas of set theory, Levy collapse and the Feferman–Levy model.

His students include Dov Gabbay, Moti Gitik, and Menachem Magidor.

Selected works 
 
 A. Lévy: A hierarchy of formulas in set theory, Memoirs of the American Mathematical Society, 57, 1965.
 J. D. Halpern, A. Lévy: The Boolean prime ideal theorem does not imply the axiom of choice, Axiomatic Set Theory, Symposia Pure Math., 1971, 83–134.
 A. Lévy: Basic Set Theory, Springer-Verlag, Berlin, 1979, 391 pages; reprinted by Dover Publications, 2003.

Notes

References

External links 
 

1934 births
Living people
Israeli mathematicians
Set theorists
Academic staff of the Hebrew University of Jerusalem
Hebrew University of Jerusalem alumni